Amar Singh may refer to:

 Amar Singh (cricketer) (1910–1940), Indian test cricketer
 Amar Singh (politician) (1956–2020), Indian politician
 Amar Singh Chamkila (1961–1988), Punjabi singer, songwriter, musician, and composer
 Amar Singh Thapa (1751–?), commander of the Nepal Army
Amar Singh Thapa (sardar), Nepalese general and Governor of Palpa
 Amar Singh Rathore (1613–1644), 17th-century nobleman
 Amar Singh Shaunki (1916–1981), singer
 Amar Singh I (1559–1620), ruler of Mewar, Udaipur 1597-1620
 Amar Singh II (1672–1710), ruler of Mewar 1698–1710
 Amar Singh (general), 13th century military general of Brahmachal, greater Sylhet
 Amar Singh (Punjab politician), MP for Fatehgarh Sahib, Punjab
 Amar Singh (art dealer) (born 1989), art gallerist and activist
 Amar Singh College, Srinagar, Jammu and Kashmir

See also
 Amar Singh Gate, another name for the Lahore Gate of Agra Fort